Monochamus griseoplagiatus is a species of beetle in the family Cerambycidae. It was described by James Thomson in 1858. It is known from Sierra Leone and Gabon.

Subspecies
 Monochamus griseoplagiatus griseoplagiatus Thomson, 1858
 Monochamus griseoplagiatus leonensis (Dillon & Dillon, 1961)

References

griseoplagiatus
Beetles described in 1858